Manorbier Castle is a Norman castle in Manorbier,  southwest of Tenby, Wales. It was founded in the late 11th century by the Anglo-Norman de Barry family. The castle was part of a mesne lordship under the control of the medieval Earls of Pembroke.

Construction
Manorbier enclosure castle has curtain walls and round and square towers. Standing on a natural coastal promontory with no external moat, the main entrance to the inner ward is a tower gateway with a portcullis, a roof, embrasures and a heavy iron/wood door. A postern gate provided access to the beach and the sea. The southeast tower is round; the northeast is angular. The castle's domestic ranges, which were completed in the 1140s, included kitchens, apartments and a Great hall. Windows replaced the arrowslits in the domestic range. A chapel with elaborate vaulting and plaster-work was built . Some of the original medieval frescoes survive.

Earthworks completed an outer ward. There was no barbican. A bridge across a neck ditch linked the inner and outer wards.

History 
The land was granted to Odo de Barri, a Norman knight, at the end of the 11th century. Initially, he constructed a motte-and-bailey castle on the site which had a wooden keep defended by a palisade and earthworks embankments. In the early part of the 12th century, William de Barri, Odo's son, used locally quarried Limestone to strengthen the fortification.

In 1146 Gerald of Wales, the great 12th-century scholar known as Geraldus Cambrensis was born at the castle. He was the fourth and youngest son of William de Barri, who was related on his mother's side, to the legendary Welsh princess Nest ferch Rhys. Gerald wrote of his birthplace:
"In all the broad lands of Wales, Manorbier is the most pleasant place by far."
In the castle's history, it was only attacked twice; both were minor skirmishes. In 1327, Richard de Barri assaulted Manorbier in a dispute over family succession. Then 300 years later during the English Civil War, the castle was seized in 1645 by Parliamentarian forces. It was then slighted to prevent further military use by the Royalists.

Through the 17th and 18th centuries, Manorbier fell into decay. However, in 1880 the castle was partially restored by J.R.Cobb, a tenant who carried out repairs to the buildings and walls.

Present day

The privately-owned castle is open to the public together with the gardens, the dovecote and the mill. The castle is a wedding venue and part has been converted into a holiday cottage.

Gallery

Media appearances
The castle was used as Cair Paravel and The White Witch Castle by the BBC in an adaption of The Chronicles of Narnia, and would later be used in Dragonworld.

The 2003 film I Capture the Castle was shot largely on location at the castle.

An episode of the 1960s television series 'Danger 
Man' ('Secret Agent' in the US), "The Conspirators", was partly shot at the castle.

External links 

Official website
www.geograph.co.uk : photos of Manorbier Castle and surrounding area

References

Castles in Pembrokeshire
De Barry family
Grade I listed castles in Wales
Grade I listed buildings in Pembrokeshire